Lomonosovo is a rural locality (a selo) in Kholmogorskoye Rural Settlement of Kholmogorsky District, Arkhangelsk Oblast, Russia. The population was 163 as of 2010.

The Russian scientist and writer Mikhail Lomonosov was born in the village (then known as Mishaninskaya and later renamed in his honor).

Geography 
Lomonosovo neighbors the rural locality of Kholmogory, located 3 km east.

References 

Rural localities in Kholmogorsky District
Kholmogorsky Uyezd